Tariq Raihan Kazi (born 6 October 2000) is a Finnish-born Bangladeshi professional footballer who plays as a defender for Bangladesh Football Premier League club Bashundhara Kings and the Bangladesh national team. Primarily a right wing-back, he can play as a right back or right midfielder and can also be deployed as a centre back.

Kazi is the second Bangladeshi descent footballer to represent Bangladesh internationally after Danish-born Jamal Bhuyan. He represented Finland at U17 and U19 levels internationally, before switching national sides. He also made an appearance in the UEFA Europa League qualifying stage for Ilves.

Personal life
Kazi was born to a Finnish mother and a Bangladeshi father in Tampere. Kazi, who has represented Finland in the U17, U18, U19 national team, also has a Bangladeshi passport due to his family roots. His father Sahidul Kazi is a teacher of Tampare University of applied science. Kazi is the grandson of the heroic freedom fighter and school teacher of naogaon, Abdul Jabber Kazi, who was martyred in the battlefield of 1971 liberation war. He has a brother and two sisters.

Club career

2017: Ilves 
Kazi began his career with Ilves, making his Veikkausliiga debut for the club in June 2018 as a substitute in a 3–1 loss to KuPS. On 19 July 2018, Kazi became the first ever Bangladeshi to play in a Europa League match. He came on as a substitute in the 76th minute for Jani Tanska, as Ilves defeated Bulgarian club PFC Slavia Sofia 2–1.

2018: HJS Akatemia 
Tariq spent the 2018–19 season on loan at Swedish club HJS Akatemia who currently play in the Kakkonen which is the third level in the league system of Finnish football and comprises 36 Finnish football teams. During the season Tariq managed to make 8 appearances for the club.

2020: Bashundhara Kings 
In November 2019, Kazi joined Bangladesh Football Premier League side Bashundhara Kings on a three-year deal.

International career
Having represented Finland at youth international level, in November 2020, Kazi was called up to the Bangladesh squad for their friendlies against Nepal but had to withdraw from the squad due to injury.

On 3 June 2021, Kazi made his senior international debut for Bangladesh in a 1–1 draw against Afghanistan in the country's 2022 FIFA World Cup qualifier, playing full 90 minutes.

Career statistics

Club

International

Honours
Ilves
 Finnish Cup: 2019

Bashundhara Kings
 Bangladesh Premier League: 2020–21, 2021-22
 Federation Cup: 2020–21
 Independence Cup: 2022-23

References

External links
 Profile at the Football Association of Finland
 

2000 births
Living people
Footballers from Tampere
Bangladeshi people of Finnish descent
Finnish people of Bangladeshi descent
Bangladeshi footballers
Finnish footballers
Association football fullbacks
FC Ilves players
HJS Akatemia players
Bashundhara Kings players
Veikkausliiga players
Kakkonen players
Bangladesh Football Premier League players
Finland youth international footballers
Bangladesh international footballers